The 2018–19 Maine Black Bears men's basketball team represented the University of Maine in the 2018–19 NCAA Division I men's basketball season. They played their home games at the Cross Insurance Center in Bangor, Maine and were led by 1st-year head coach Richard Barron, who previously served as the head coach of Maine's women's basketball team. They finished the season 5–27 overall, 3–13 in conference play to finish in a tie for eighth place. As the 8th seed in the 2019 America East men's basketball tournament, they were defeated by top-seeded Vermont 57–73 in the quarterfinals.

Previous season
The Black Bears finished the 2017–18 season 6–26, 3–13 in the America East Conference play to finish in eighth place. In the America East tournament, they lost to Vermont in the quarterfinals. On March 5, the school parted ways with head coach Bob Walsh and within hours hired Richard Barron, who was previously head coach Maine's women's basketball team from 2011–2017.

Roster

Schedule and results

|-
!colspan=12 style=| Exhibition

|-
!colspan=12 style=| Non-conference regular season

|-
!colspan=9 style=| America East Conference regular season

|-
!colspan=12 style=| America East tournament
|-

|-

Source

See also
 2018–19 Maine Black Bears women's basketball team

References

Maine Black Bears men's basketball seasons
Maine Black Bears
Maine Black Bears men's basketball
Maine Black Bears men's basketball